Charles Constance César Joseph Matthieu d'Agoult de Bonneval (1747 in Grenoble– 1824 in Paris) was a French Roman Catholic bishop, and after his resignation of his diocese a political writer.

His eldest brother, François-Edouard-Augustin-Venceslas-Hippolyte, Marquis d'Agoult, was Maréchal-de-Camp in the royal army. Another brother, Antoine-Jean, Vicomte d'Agoult, held the rank of Mestre-de-camp, and was a Commander in the Order of Saint Lazare. Another brother, Louis-Annibale, was also a Maréchal-de-Camp.

Career
Agoult studied at the Seminary of St. Sulpice at Paris. He was Vicar-General of the diocese of Soissons, and then Vicar-General of Cardinal de Rouchefoucauld at Rouen. He was named Bishop of Pamiers by King Louis XVI of France on 28 January 1787, and received approval from Pope Pius VI on 23 April 1787. He was consecrated a bishop on 13 May 1787.

In 1789 Agoult sought election to the Estates General, but he was refused by his own clergy on 4 April. He left Pamiers.

During the French Revolution he helped prepare the abortive escape train for Louis XVI at Vincennes, but then emigrated, and settled in Coblentz in the faction of the Comte d'Artois. It is said that he had been a lover of Mme. de Matignon, and that he intrigued to be Garde de Scaux or Chancellor in a future royal administration. But he returned to France in 1801,  having resigned his bishopric as required by Pope Pius VII, though only after some attempt at negotiating better terms.

Works
Conversation avec E. Burke, sur l'interêt des puissances de l'Europe (Paris, 1814)
Projet d'une banque nationale (Paris, 1815)
Lettre à un Jacobin, ou réflexions politiques sur la constitution d'Angleterre et la charte royale (Paris, 1815)
Eclaircissement sur le projet d'une banque nationale (Paris, 1816)

Notes and References

Bibliography

1747 births
1824 deaths
Writers from Grenoble
Bishops of Pamiers
18th-century French writers
18th-century French male writers
People of the French Revolution
18th-century French Roman Catholic bishops
French political writers
French business theorists
French male non-fiction writers
Clergy from Grenoble